Bob Gentry is an American singer-songwriter.

Biography
Bob Gentry was born in Detroit. By the age of 7, he was a self-taught pianist and guitarist who started songwriting and playing to express himself.

Moisture
In the late-1990s, Gentry formed the rock band Moisture, then moved to Los Angeles and reincarnated the band with new members. Moisture performed live on television and was offered a recording contract from Farmclub.com, a branch of Interscope Records. Farmclub was canceled before Moisture was able to release or record a new album and the group eventually disbanded.

Solo career
As Moisture broke up, Gentry released his first solo album in 2005 and another titled Seconds in 2010. In 2006, he won the Los Angeles Music Award for Singer-Songwriter of the Year in the Rock category. Later that year, his song "Never Know" was placed in the Fox TV series Bones. Also in 2006, he joined the cast of the NBC show StarTomorrow, which featured David Foster as the head judge. Gentry made it to the finals. The Gentry song "Beat into You" is on the soundtrack to the film Hollywood & Wine, which will be released in 2011.

Discography
 Moisture – "Bastard" 1996
 Moisture – "Moisture" 2001
 Bob Gentry – "Bob Gentry 2004
 Bob Gentry – "Seconds" 2010

References

External links
 
Official Bob Gentry Twitter 

Living people
1971 births
American male singer-songwriters
American acoustic guitarists
American male guitarists
Singers from Detroit
Guitarists from Detroit
American male pianists
21st-century American singers
21st-century American pianists
21st-century American guitarists
21st-century American male singers
Singer-songwriters from Michigan